Paul E. Danielson (born c. 1946) is a former Arkansas Supreme Court justice serving from 2006 to 2016. He was previously the Circuit Judge for Arkansas's 15th Judicial Circuit.

Education
Paul Danielson received his bachelor's degree from Florida State University in 1968 and a law degree from the University of Arkansas School of Law.

References

External links
Arkansas Supreme Court

1946 births
Living people
Arkansas lawyers
Florida State University alumni
Arkansas state court judges
Justices of the Arkansas Supreme Court
University of Arkansas alumni